DNN may refer to:

Digital News Network, a defunct digital radio news service in the United Kingdom
DNN Corporation, a software company founded by the creators of DotNetNuke
DNN (software), formerly DotNetNuke, a web content management system developed by DNN Corporation
Dinosaur News Network, a parody of Cable News Network on Dinosaurs (TV series)
Dalton Municipal Airport in Dalton, Georgia
Deep neural network, a type of artificial neural network